Apha floralis is a moth in the family Eupterotidae. It was described by Arthur Gardiner Butler in 1881. It is found in Nepal.

References

Moths described in 1881
Eupterotinae